Mary Fowler may refer to:

 Mary Blackford Fowler (1892–1982), American painter and sculptor
 Mary Fowler (geologist) (born 1950), British geologist and academic
 Mary Fowler (soccer) (born 2003), Australian soccer player